Oxalis ( (American English) or  (British English)) is a large genus of flowering plants in the wood-sorrel family Oxalidaceae, comprising over 550 species. The genus occurs throughout most of the world, except for the polar areas; species diversity is particularly rich in tropical Brazil, Mexico, and South Africa.

Many of the species are known as wood sorrels (sometimes written "woodsorrels" or "wood-sorrels") as they have an acidic taste reminiscent of the sorrel proper (Rumex acetosa), which is only distantly related. Some species are called yellow sorrels or pink sorrels after the color of their flowers instead. Other species are colloquially known as false shamrocks, and some called sourgrasses. For the genus as a whole, the term oxalises is also used.

Description and ecology

These plants are annual or perennial. The leaves are divided into three to ten or more obovate and top-notched leaflets, arranged palmately with all the leaflets of roughly equal size. The majority of species have three leaflets; in these species, the leaves are superficially similar to those of some clovers. Some species exhibit rapid changes in leaf angle in response to temporarily high light intensity to decrease photoinhibition.

The flowers have five petals, which are usually fused at the base, and ten stamens. The petal color varies from white to pink, red or yellow; anthocyanins and xanthophylls may be present or absent but are generally not both present together in significant quantities, meaning that few wood-sorrels have bright orange flowers. The fruit is a small capsule containing several seeds. The roots are often tuberous and succulent, and several species also  reproduce vegetatively by production of bulbils, which detach to produce new plants.

Several Oxalis species dominate the plant life in local woodland ecosystems, be it 
Coast Range ecoregion of the North American Pacific Northwest, or the Sydney Turpentine-Ironbark Forest in southeastern Australia where least yellow sorrel (O. exilis) is common. In the United Kingdom and neighboring Europe, common wood sorrel (O. acetosella) is the typical woodland member of this genus, forming large swaths in the typical mixed deciduous forests dominated by downy birch (Betula pubescens) and sessile oak (Quercus petraea), by sycamore maple (Acer pseudoplatanus), common bracken (Pteridium aquilinum), pedunculate oak (Q. robur) and blackberries (Rubus fruticosus agg.), or by common ash (Fraxinus excelsior), dog's mercury (Mercurialis perennis) and European rowan (Sorbus aucuparia); it is also common in woods of common juniper (Juniperus communis ssp. communis). Some species – notably Bermuda-buttercup (O. pes-caprae) and creeping woodsorrel (O. corniculata) – are pernicious, invasive weeds when escaping from cultivation outside their native ranges; the ability of most wood-sorrels to store reserve energy in their tubers makes them quite resistant to most weed control techniques.

A 2019 study suggested that species from this genus have a symbiotic relationship with nitrogen fixing Bacillus endophytes, storing them in plant tissues and seeds, which could explain its ability to spread rapidly even in poor soils.

Tuberous woodsorrels provide food for certain small herbivores – such as the Montezuma quail (Cyrtonyx montezumae). The foliage is eaten by some Lepidoptera, such as the Polyommatini pale grass blue (Pseudozizeeria maha) – which feeds on creeping wood sorrel and others – and dark grass blue (Zizeeria lysimon).

Oxalis species are susceptible to rust (Puccinia oxalidis).

Use by humans

As food
Wood sorrel (a type of oxalis) is an edible wild plant that has been consumed by humans around the world for millennia. In Dr. James Duke's Handbook of Edible Weeds, he notes that the Native American Kiowa people chewed wood sorrel to alleviate thirst on long trips, the Potawatomi cooked it with sugar to make a dessert, the Algonquin considered it an aphrodisiac, the Cherokee ate wood sorrel to alleviate mouth sores and a sore throat, and the Iroquois ate wood sorrel to help with cramps, fever and nausea.

The fleshy, juicy edible tubers of the oca (O. tuberosa) have long been cultivated for food in Colombia and elsewhere in the northern Andes mountains of South America. It is grown and sold in New Zealand as "New Zealand yam" (although not a true yam), and varieties are now available in yellow, orange, apricot, and pink, as well as the traditional red-orange.

The leaves of scurvy-grass sorrel (O. enneaphylla) were eaten by sailors travelling around Patagonia as a source of vitamin C to avoid scurvy.

In India, creeping wood sorrel (O. corniculata) is eaten only seasonally, starting in December–January. The Bodos of north east India sometimes prepare a sour fish curry with its leaves. The leaves of common wood sorrel (O. acetosella) may be used to make a lemony-tasting tea when dried.

For its oxalic acid content

A characteristic of members of this genus is that they contain oxalic acid (whose name references the genus), giving the leaves and flowers a sour taste which can make them refreshing to chew. The crude calcium oxalate ranges from 13 to 25 mg/g fresh weight for woodsorrel as compared to 1.3 to 1.8 mg/g for spinach. In very large amounts, oxalic acid may be considered slightly toxic, interfering with proper digestion and kidney function. However, oxalic acid is also present in more commonly consumed foods such as spinach, broccoli, brussels sprouts, grapefruit, chives, and rhubarb, among many others. A non-medical expert summary is that, on the one hand, the risk of sheer toxicity, actual poisoning from oxalic acid in persons with normal kidney function is "wildly unlikely", while, in the other hand, the mechanical effects of crystals of calcium oxalate contribute substantially to some pathological conditions, such as gout and (especially) nephrolithiasis.

While any oxalic acid-containing plant, such as Oxalis, is toxic to humans in some dosage, the U.S. National Institutes of Health note that oxalic acid is present in many foodstuffs found in the supermarket and its toxicity is generally of little or no consequence for people who eat a variety of foods.

In the past, it was a practice to extract crystals of calcium oxalate for use in treating diseases and as a salt called sal acetosella or "sorrel salt" (also known as "salt of lemon"). Growing oca tuber root caps are covered in a fluorescent slush rich in harmaline and harmine which apparently suppresses pests. Creeping wood sorrel and perhaps other species are apparently hyperaccumulators of copper. The Ming Dynasty text Precious Secrets of the Realm of the King of Xin from 1421 describes how O. corniculata can be used to locate copper deposits as well as for geobotanical prospecting. It thus ought to have some potential for phytoremediation of contaminated soils.

As ornamental plants

Several species are grown as pot plants or as ornamental plants in gardens, for example, O. versicolor.

Oxalis flowers range in colour from whites to yellow, peaches, pink, or multi-coloured flowers.

Some varieties have double flowers, for example the double form of O. compressus. Some varieties are grown for their foliage, such as the dark purple-leaved O. triangularis.

Species with four regular leaflets – in particular O. tetraphylla (four-leaved pink-sorrel) – are sometimes misleadingly sold as "four-leaf clover", taking advantage of the mystical status of four-leaf clover.

Selected species

 Oxalis acetosella – common wood sorrel, stabwort
 Oxalis adenophylla – Chilean oxalis, silver shamrock
 Oxalis albicans – hairy woodsorrel, white oxalis, radishroot woodsorrel, radishroot yellow-sorrel, California yellow-sorrel
 Oxalis alpina – alpine sorrel
 Oxalis ambigua
 Oxalis articulata Savign. – pink-sorrel
 Oxalis ausensis
 Oxalis barrelieri – lavender sorrel
 Oxalis bowiei – Bowie's wood-sorrel, Cape shamrock
 Oxalis brasiliensis – Brazilian woodsorrel
 Oxalis caerulea – blue woodsorrel
 Oxalis caprina
 Oxalis corniculata – creeping wood sorrel, procumbent yellow-sorrel, sleeping beauty, chichoda bhaji (India)
 Oxalis debilis Kunth
 Oxalis decaphylla – ten-leaved pink-sorrel, tenleaf wood sorrel
 Oxalis dehradunensis
 Oxalis depressa
 Oxalis dichondrifolia – peonyleaf wood sorrel
 Oxalis dillenii Jacquin – southern yellow woodsorrel, Dillen's woodsorrel, Sussex yellow-sorrel
 Oxalis drummondii – Drummond's woodsorrel, chevron oxalis
 Oxalis ecuadorensis
 Oxalis enneaphylla – scurvy-grass sorrel
 Oxalis exilis – least yellow-sorrel
 Oxalis frutescens – shrubby wood-sorrel
 Oxalis gigantea
 Oxalis glabra – finger-leaf
 Oxalis grandis – great yellow-sorrel, large yellow woodsorrel
 Oxalis griffithii Edgew. & Hook.f.
 Oxalis hedysaroides – fire fern
 Oxalis hirta – hairy sorrel
 Oxalis illinoensis – Illinois wood-sorrel
 Oxalis inaequalis
 Oxalis incarnata L. – pale pink-sorrel
 Oxalis lasiandra – Mexican shamrock
 Oxalis latifolia Kunth – garden pink-sorrel
 Oxalis luederitzii
 Oxalis luteola Jacq.
 Oxalis magellanica G.Forst.
 Oxalis magnifica Kunth – snowdrop wood-sorrel
 Oxalis massoniana
 Oxalis megalorrhiza – fleshy yellow-sorrel
 Oxalis melanosticta
 Oxalis micrantha – dwarf woodsorrel
 Oxalis montana – mountain woodsorrel, white woodsorrel
 Oxalis nelsonii – Nelson's sorrel
 Oxalis norlindiana
 Oxalis obliquifolia
 Oxalis oregana – redwood sorrel, Oregon sorrel
 Oxalis ortgiesii Regel – fishtail oxalis
 Oxalis pennelliana
 Oxalis pes-caprae – Bermuda-buttercup, African wood-sorrel, Bermuda sorrel, buttercup oxalis, Cape sorrel, English weed, soursob, "goat's-foot", "sourgrass", soursop (not to be confused with the fruit of that name)
 Oxalis priceae – tufted yellow-sorrel
 Oxalis pulchella
 Oxalis purpurea L. – purple wood-sorrel
 Oxalis rosea Feuillée ex Jacq. – annual pink-sorrel
 Oxalis rubra A.St.-Hil. – red wood-sorrel
 Oxalis rufescens
 Oxalis rugeliana – coamo
 Oxalis schaeferi
 Oxalis spiralis – spiral sorrel, volcanic sorrel, velvet oxalis
 Oxalis stricta – common yellow woodsorrel, common yellow oxalis, upright yellow-sorrel, lemon clover, "pickle plant", "sourgrass, "yellow woodsorrel"
 Oxalis suksdorfii – western yellow woodsorrel, western yellow oxalis
 Oxalis tenuifolia – thinleaf sorrel
 Oxalis tetraphylla – four-leaved pink-sorrel, four-leaf sorrel, Iron Cross oxalis, "lucky clover"
 Oxalis triangularis – threeleaf purple shamrock
 Oxalis trilliifolia – great oxalis, threeleaf woodsorrel
 Oxalis tuberosa – oca, oka, New Zealand yam
 Oxalis valdiviensis – Chilean yellow-sorrel
 Oxalis virginea – virgin wood-sorrel
 Oxalis versicolor – candycane sorrel 
 Oxalis violacea – violet wood-sorrel
 Oxalis vulcanicola – volcanic sorrel or velvet oxalis

References

Further reading

 Bais, Harsh Pal; Park, Sang-Wook; Stermitz, Frank R.; Halligan, Kathleen M. & Vivanco, Jorge M. (2002): Exudation of fluorescent β-carbolines from Oxalis tuberosa L. roots. Phytochemistry 61(5): 539–543.  PDF fulltext
 Bais, Harsh Pal; Vepachedu, Ramarao & Vivanco, Jorge M. (2003): Root specific elicitation and exudation of fluorescent β-carbolines in transformed root cultures of Oxalis tuberosa. Plant Physiology and Biochemistry 41(4): 345-353.  Preprint PDF fulltext
 Łuczaj, Łukasz (2008): Archival data on wild food plants used in Poland in 1948. Journal of Ethnobiology and Ethnomedicine 4: 4.  PDF fulltext

 
Oxalidales genera